Marvel Super War is a free-to-play 3D, third-person multiplayer online battle arena (MOBA) game by NetEase and Marvel Entertainment.

Gameplay

Development
It is in beta both on Android and iOS and is available to download only in selected countries. The game was released in December 2019.

Reception

Ban in India
The mobile app was banned in India (along with other Chinese apps) on September 2, 2020 by the government, the move came amid the 2020 China-India skirmish.

References

External links

 
 Official website

2019 video games
Android (operating system) games
Free online games
IOS games
Superhero crossover video games
Video games based on Marvel Comics
Video games developed in China
NetEase games
Internet censorship in India